The Sins of Mankind is the third album by British death metal band Cancer. It was released in 1993 by Vinyl Solution. The cover painting is Armageddon by Joseph Paul Pettit.

Track listing
  "Cloak of Darkness"   – 3:58
  "Electro-Convulsive Therapy"  – 3:54
  "Patchwork Destiny"  – 3:18
  "Meat Train"  – 4:48
  "Suffer for Our Sins"  – 4:54
  "Pasture of Delight / At the End"  – 5:03
  "Tribal Bloodshed Part I: The Conquest"  – 2:42
  "Tribal Bloodshed Part II: Under the Flag"  – 5:53

Credits 
 Carl Stokes – drums
 Ian Buchanan – bass guitar
 John Walker – rhythm and acoustic guitars, vocals
 Barry Savage – lead guitar

Cancer (band) albums
1993 albums